Wu Zetian (624–705), also romanized as Wu Ze Tian or Wu Tse-Tien, was a Chinese empress of the Zhou dynasty (690–705).

Wu Zetian may also refer to:

 Wu Zetian (1995 TV series), 1995 Chinese television series
 The Empress Wu Tse-tien (1939 film), 1939 Chinese film starring Violet Koo
 Empress Wu Tse-Tien (1963 film), 1963 Hong Kong film starring Li Li-hua
 Empress Wu (TV series) or Wu Zetian, 1984 Hong Kong television series
 Wu Zi Bei Ge: Wu Zetian Zhuan, 2006 Chinese television series starring Siqin Gaowa

See also
 Empress Wu (disambiguation)
 The Empress of the Dynasty, 1985 Taiwanese television series starring Angela Pan
 The Shadow of Empress Wu, also known as Riyue Lingkong, 2007 Chinese television series starring Liu Xiaoqing
 Secret History of Empress Wu, 2011 Chinese television series
 The Empress of China, 2016 Chinese television series
 
 :Category: Works about Wu Zetian